Elias Dumaresq, 3rd Seigneur of Augrès (c. 1620-1677) was born to Abraham Dumaresq, 2nd Seigneur of Augrès and Susan de Carteret daughter of Philippe de Carteret I, 2nd Seigneur of Sark and his wife Racheal Paulet. He was a Royalist and a Jurat of the Royal Court.

Civil War 
Elias was a staunch Royalist during the English Civil War along with his cousins George Carteret and Phillip de Carteret, and remained loyal to the crown during the Interregnum. For his loyalty the proclaimed King Charles II visited him at Les Augrès Manor in 1649 and gave Elias a Grant to the fief of Augrès, and was then held by Knight's Service.

Family 
Elias married Jane Payn the daughter of Rev. Thomas Payn, Rector of St. Laurence. They had the following Issue:

 Elias Dumaresq 4th Seigneur of Augrès (1648-1731), married Frances De Carteret daughter of Francis De Carteret.
 Elias Dumaresq 5th Seigneur of Augrès (1674-1754), married Elizabeth De Carteret
Rev Daniel Dumaresq, FRS
John Dumaresq
 Philip Dumaresq
 Captain John Dumaresq
 Anne Dumaresq
 Philip Dumaresq, married Sarah Le Gros
 Lieutenant Edward Dumaresq, RN
 John Dumaresq Greffier of the Royal Court, married Ann Bokenham, niece of Captain William Bokenham
 Captain William Dumaresq (1720-1813)
William Dumaresq, married Charlotte Dumaresq
Thomas Dumaresq
Philippe Dumaresq, married Elizabeth Piton (father of James Dumaresq)
 Admiral Thomas Dumaresq (1729–1802)
Charlotte Dumaresq, married William Dumaresq
 Ann Dumaresq, married Lieutenant Burton
 Anne Dumaresq (1653-), married John Durell, Lieutenant Bailiff of Jersey:
 Captain Thomas Durrell (1685-1741)
 Ann Durell, married Colonel Matthew de Sausmarez
 Captain Philip Saumarez
Matthew Saumarez (father of Admiral James Saumarez, 1st Baron de Saumarez, and General Sir Thomas Saumarez)
John Durrell, married Elizabeth Corbet
Vice-Admiral Philip Durell (1707 – 1766)
Captain George Charles Durrell (1713-1754)
Captain Thomas Durrell
 Benjamin Dumaresq (1655-)
 Elizabeth Dumaresq (1669-), married Lieutenant-Colonel Matthew Le Geyt

Ancestry
Ancestry:

References 

Carteret family
Jersey people
1620 births
1677 deaths
Year of birth uncertain